The 1910 season was the 3rd in which the Eastern Suburbs District Rugby League Football Club's competed in the New South Wales Rugby Football League premiership. They finishing the season in 3rd position(out of 8).

Players

Pre Season

Season

 Premiership Round 3, Saturday 21 May 1910.
South Sydney 14 (T. Anderson 2, J.Rosewell, H.Butler Tries; Hallett Goal) 
defeated 
Eastern Suburbs 10 (Messenger 5 Goals) at the Agricultural Society's Ground.
{{cquote
|"South Sydney beat Eastern Suburbs On The Post"
"Quite 4000 people were present at the Agricultural Ground to witness this match which was a fine exposition of Northern Union rules. With only a few minutes to go South turned what seemed to be almost certain defeat into a highly meritorius victory. Their wonderful staying powers allowed them to secure the verdict by 14 points to 10."
     
At 3.25 Messenger led his side into the field. South followed a minute later. Messenger kicked off from the Randwick end. East secured a "free" almost immediately, but Messenger's effort, although a good one, did not secure the two points. South rallied, Davis putting in some effective work, but wild passing lost South a chance. The ever present Messenger then marked right in front of South's goal, this time making no mistake. East, 2 South nil. Play was even for a while, until Anderson secured, and made a dash for the line, but he was tackled by Messenger, and laid out for some minutes. A "knock-on" close to the line gave South a timely relief, but little ground was gained. Messenger was again in the limelight with a dodgy run, but he was tackled at the 25. Hot work in South's territory occurred until Conlin relieved. East were now playing like a book, and taking advantage of every opportunity. They obtained 6 points in as many minutes - the first two for a "free", the second two from a mark, and another "free", for offside making the six. Messenger's kicking was a revelation, the crowd cheering enthusiastically. The next item of interest, was some good work by the South's forwards, which brought the ball close to East's goal line, and from a scrum the ball came out to Rosewell, who raced over. Conlin failed to convert, the kick being a poor one. The interval arrived with the scores unaltered. Eastern Suburbs 8, South Sydney 3. On resuming East at once forced the pace, Messenger, and subsequently Frawley, making the efforts. The later was almost through when he was forced out at the corner. South then took a hand, a good passing bout (in which H Butler was the last to receive) resulting in South's total being increased to 6 points. Hallett failed to add the extras. Easts then became dangerous, Messenger being here, there and everywhere, rendering his side great assistance, as he seemed to be perfectly at home on both wings. On one occasion he "marked" in a good position whilst lying prostrate, but Frawley was not successful in his kick, the ball going a little wide. Play was uninteresting for a few minutes, the tackling of South still keeping at a high standard. Anderson tried to get through, but was not fast enough. Scrums became frequent, South being the first to initiate a passing movement in which all their threequarters participated, Anderson was grassed at halfway with only the fullback to beat. Off-side against the red and green gave Messenger another opportunity in the goal-potting line. It was his eighth kick at goal and his fifth success in the match, the ball sailing over beautifully. South then started to press, the passing showing great improvement. A brilliant run by Anderson, who skirted the line half the length of the field, ended in his securing a try. It was unconverted. The excitement was intense, and South were playing with wonderful heart. Time and again they swept down, and eventually Anderson again electrified the crowd by gathering in and rushing over. It was a grand try. Hallett converted. The whistle then blew, South winning a memorable contest by 14 points to 10.

Ladder

Point analysis

Offence
The lowdown:

Eastern Suburbs completed the following score options in the 1910 season:

48 tries
52 goals
0 field goals

The result:

Eastern Suburbs scored a total of 248 points in 1910.

The verdict:

Eastern Suburbs try scoring ability improved by 22.9% on their previous season.
Eastern Suburbs goal scoring ability improved by 38.4% on their previous season.
Eastern Suburbs field goal kicking ability was maintained on their previous season.
Eastern Suburbs overall point scoring ability improved 31% on their previous season.
Eastern Suburbs total point score improved by 32.6% on their previous season.

Defence
The lowdown:

Eastern Suburbs conceded the following score options in the 1908 season:

22 tries
24 goals
1 field goals

The result:

Eastern Suburbs conceded a total of 116 points in the 1910 season.

The verdict:

Eastern Suburbs try scoring defence improved by 42.1% on their previous season.
Eastern Suburbs goal kicking defence dropped by 12.5% on their previous season.
Eastern Suburbs field goal defence dropped by 100% on their previous season.
Eastern Suburbs overall defense improved by 20.3% on their previous season.
Eastern Suburbs total points against defensive effort improved by 17.7% on their previous season.

Season Summary

 Eastern Suburbs finished the 1910 season in 3rd (of 8) position.
 For the third consecutive season Eastern Suburbs won the reserve grade competition.
 Dally Messenger was the top point scorer in the New South Wales Rugby League with 71 points.
 Dally Messenger was the only Eastern Suburbs player to be selected to represent Australia in 1910.

Notes
 The semi-final format had been changed for the 1910 season, and saw only the leading two sides play-off for that year's premiership.
 Dan Frawley, previously contracted to the Warrington club, made a guest appearance for England in there tour match against Newcastle.

References

External links
Rugby League Tables and Statistics
 Ian Heads, True Blue - the true story of the NSW Rugby League,

Sydney Roosters seasons
Eastern Suburbs season
East